Chao Cheng-hsueng (born 31 January 1940) is a Taiwanese weightlifter. He competed in the men's middleweight event at the 1964 Summer Olympics.

References

1940 births
Living people
Taiwanese male weightlifters
Olympic weightlifters of Taiwan
Weightlifters at the 1964 Summer Olympics
Place of birth missing (living people)
Medalists at the 1970 Asian Games
Asian Games silver medalists for Chinese Taipei
Weightlifters at the 1970 Asian Games
Asian Games medalists in weightlifting
20th-century Taiwanese people